The Census of Governments is a census performed by the United States Census Bureau. The Census of Governments occurs twice-per-decade, in years ending with 2 and 7. The survey identifies the scope of American government at the federal, state, and municipal levels by measuring public finance, public employment, classifies municipal government structures and activities, and identifies municipal authorities and Special-purpose districts. The Census of Governments in its current form started in year 1957.

Revenue and expenditures reported for state & local governments in dollars and as a percent of gross domestic product for 2017 are as follows:

By comparison US GDP in 2017 was $19.5 trillion. Note that "State & local" is less than the sum of "State" and "Local" because of funds transfers.

References

External links
 .

Governments, Census of
Government in the United States
Public domain databases
1957 establishments in the United States